David Leach may refer to:

 David Leach (potter) (1911–2005), English studio potter
 David Leach (admiral) (1928–2020), Royal Australian Navy officer
 David Leach (activist) (born 1945), Des Moines anti-abortion activist